New York City's 44th City Council district is one of 51 districts in the New York City Council. It has been represented by Democrat Kalman Yeger since 2018, succeeding fellow Democrat David Greenfield. Though Yeger caucuses with Democrats on the Council, he is among the Council's most conservative members and has run for office on both Democratic and Republican party lines.

Geography
District 44 is based in the heavily Orthodox Jewish neighborhood of Borough Park in southwestern Brooklyn, also covering Ocean Parkway and parts of Bensonhurst and Midwood.

The district overlaps with Brooklyn Community Boards 11, 12, 14, and 15, and with New York's 9th, 10th, and 11th congressional districts. It also overlaps with the 17th and 22nd districts of the New York State Senate, and with the 44th, 45th, 47th, 48th, and 49th districts of the New York State Assembly.

Recent election results

2021

In 2019, voters in New York City approved Ballot Question 1, which implemented ranked-choice voting in all local elections. Under the new system, voters have the option to rank up to five candidates for every local office. Voters whose first-choice candidates fare poorly will have their votes redistributed to other candidates in their ranking until one candidate surpasses the 50 percent threshold. If one candidate surpasses 50 percent in first-choice votes, then ranked-choice tabulations will not occur.

2017
In 2017, Councilman David Greenfield left the Council in order to lead the Metropolitan Council on Jewish Poverty. Because his departure occurred after the filing deadline for his seat, local political leaders – among them Greenfield himself – could bypass a regular primary election and instead choose the Democratic nominee for the seat. The chosen candidate was Kalman Yeger, who had previously been set to run against Councilman Chaim Deutsch in a neighboring district. The process was roundly criticized by good government groups, and eventually drew an unsuccessful general election challenge from Yoni Hikind, the son of then-Assemblyman Dov Hikind.

2013

References

New York City Council districts